Trimium is a genus of ant-loving beetles in the family Staphylinidae. There are more than 20 described species in Trimium.

Species
These 27 species belong to the genus Trimium:

 Trimium aemonae Reitter, 1881
 Trimium amplipenne Reitter, 1908
 Trimium asturicum Dodero, 1919
 Trimium atticum Besuchet, 1969
 Trimium besucheti Sabella, 1989
 Trimium brevicorne (Reichenbach, 1816)
 Trimium carpathicum Saulcy, 1875
 Trimium caucasicum Kolenati, 1846
 Trimium cavicolle Reitter, 1881
 Trimium diecki Reitter, 1882
 Trimium expandum Reitter, 1884
 Trimium foveicolle LeConte, 1878
 Trimium graecum Karaman, 1969
 Trimium hopffgarteni Reitter, 1881
 Trimium illyricum Besuchet, 1969
 Trimium imitatum Reitter, 1881
 Trimium karamani Reitter, 1913
 Trimium latiusculum Reitter, 1879
 Trimium libani J.Sahlberg, 1908
 Trimium lichtneckerti Machulka, 1949
 Trimium minimum Dodero, 1900
 Trimium paganettii Reitter, 1906
 Trimium puncticeps Reitter, 1881
 Trimium puncticolle LeConte, 1878
 Trimium raffrayi Guillebeau, 1890
 Trimium thessalicum Karaman, 1967
 Trimium zoufali Krauss, 1900

References

Further reading

External links

 

Pselaphinae
Articles created by Qbugbot